Moyross is a suburb and council estate in Limerick city in Ireland. Moyross is located on the city's north side and is the largest housing estate in Limerick.

The Roman Catholic parish of Moyross is one of 60 parishes in the Diocese of Limerick. As of the 2011 census, there were 10 people in Moyross parish.

Development
Housing development in the area started in the 1970s and 1980s. Up to 2008, the estate was unusual in that it spanned two electoral areas, with 728 houses part of the Ballynanty DED of Limerick City Council, and 432 houses in the Limerick North Rural DED of Limerick County Council. The city boundaries have since been redrawn so that the whole estate is now covered by the City Council. It comprises 1,160 houses which are divided into 12 parks.

People
Notable people associated with the area include Noel Hogan (of The Cranberries) and rugby player Keith Earls.

Transport

Moyross is served by Bus Eireann services 303 and 306 to Limerick city centre.

In October 2022, proposals were announced to open a new train station in Moyross. As of November 2022, Iarnród Éireann were reportedly looking for an "appropriate location for the new train station [..] with a view to delivery 2025".

Crime
Moyross has been associated in the media with anti-social behaviour, poverty and criminal gangs. Moyross gained notoriety with a decade-long cycle of incidents involving petrol bomb attacks, stabbings, murders and gun-related incidents, which reached a peak in 2006.

One incident that received much media attention in Ireland was the September 2006 petrol bomb attack of a car containing five-year-old Gavin Murray and seven-year-old Millie Murray, which resulted in serious injuries to both of them after their mother turned down a request from youths for a lift to a courthouse. The crime illustrated the need for government attention in Moyross and the neglect faced by housing estates in the area, compared to more affluent areas of Limerick. John Fitzgerald was appointed to lead an initiative to address issues of crime and exclusion in Moyross.

References

Buildings and structures in Limerick (city)